Timothy Downey (15 February 1874 – 24 September 1942) was an Irish Gaelic footballer who played as a forward for club sides Midleton, Young Irelands and Kickhams and was a member of the Cork and Dublin senior football teams throughout the 1890s.

Career

Born near Midleton, County Cork, Downey showed much promise as a Gaelic footballer in his youth and was selected, at the age of 16, to play for Midleton's first team in the 1890 County Championship. It was a successful campaign which yielded his first winners' medal. Downey subsequently lined out in the 1890 All-Ireland final which saw Cork claim the title after a 2–04 to 0–01 defeat of Wexford. A move to Dublin saw him join up with the Young Irelands and, in 1896, he claimed County Championship honours. Downey claimed a second successive Dublin County Championship title in 1897, however, this time it was with the Kickhams club. He ended the season by winning a second ALl-Ireland medal after Dubin's 2–06 to 0–02 defeat of Cork.

Personal life and death
The son of a national school teacher, Downey moved to Dublin about 1895 where he worked as a floorwalker in Arnotts. He died from heart failure on 24 September 1942 at Dr Steevens' Hospital and was buried in Glasnevin Cemetery. In November 2022, the GAA created a memorial to Downey in the cemetery.

Honours
Midleton
 Cork Senior Football Championship: 1890

Young Irelands
 Dublin Senior Football Championship: 1896

Kichams
 Dublin Senior Football Championship: 1897

Cork
 All-Ireland Senior Football Championship: 1890

Dublin
 All-Ireland Senior Football Championship: 1897
 Leinster Senior Football Championship: 1897

References

1874 births
1942 deaths
Midleton Gaelic footballers
Cork inter-county Gaelic footballers
Dublin inter-county Gaelic footballers
Winners of two All-Ireland medals (Gaelic football)
People from Midleton